Craigville is a part of the village of Centerville in Barnstable, Massachusetts. Craigville consists of the Craigville Beach area.

Geography
Craigville Beach is a popular tourist attraction in Craigville.

Demographics
Craigville is located in the Barnstable village of Centerville.

References

External links

Census-designated places in Barnstable County, Massachusetts
Villages in Barnstable, Massachusetts